Dick Wicks (18 August 1929 – 20 April 2006) was an  Australian rules footballer who played with St Kilda in the Victorian Football League (VFL).

See also
 List of Caulfield Grammar School people

Notes

External links 

1929 births
2006 deaths
Australian rules footballers from Victoria (Australia)
St Kilda Football Club players
People educated at Caulfield Grammar School